Buckingham Baptist Chapel is a Gothic Revival church in Queens Road, Clifton, Bristol, England.

History
The church was built in 1842 to the designs of Richard Shackleton Pope. It is one of the earliest Baptist chapels built in this style.

The chapel describes itself as 'independent evangelical baptist'. It is a former member of the Baptist Union, which it left on 7 April 1972 (hence 'independent') due to a membership decision based on 'lack of clarity in its teachings on the deity of Christ'.

The church has been led by Pastor Oliver Gross since 1 December 2015. The church currently has 1 other elder and 5 deacons, with varying roles in the upkeep of the church and its ministries, in addition to an associate member involved mainly in preaching and outreach ministries, particularly with Romanian and Roma communities in Bristol.

The church has several main meetings per week; two Sunday services and a midweek prayer and Bible study meeting on Wednesdays. Other meetings include a prayer meeting on the first Friday evening of each month, a ladies' meeting every other Tuesday and a men's breakfast Bible study held in homes the second Saturday most months.

The church has several outreach ministries such as a Sunday school held during the morning service every week, Tiger Tots (a parent and toddler group) held on Fridays during school term-time, a club for children aged 9 to 12 called Lighthouse that is also held on term-time Fridays and a young adults group held roughly every other Saturday evening.

There are many yearly events run by the church, such as a summer holiday Bible club, Christmas carol singing and a Bonfire Night party held at the home of some church members.

It has been designated by English Heritage as a Grade II listed building.

See also
 Churches in Bristol
 Grade II* listed buildings in Bristol

References

External links 
 Chapel Website

Baptist churches in Bristol
Churches completed in 1842
19th-century Baptist churches
Grade II* listed churches in Bristol
Chapels in England
19th-century churches in the United Kingdom
Churches in Clifton, Bristol
Gothic Revival church buildings in England
Gothic Revival architecture in Bristol